Bayam Oru Payanam (Fear is a journey) is an Indian Tamil-language horror film written and directed by Manisharma. The film features Vishakha Singh, Bharath Reddy and Meenakshi Dixit in the leading roles, while Singampuli plays a pivotal supporting role. Featuring music composed by YR Prasad, production for the film began in mid-2015. The film was released on 25 August 2016 in India.

Plot
The film opens as the child of a photo journalist Ram (Bharath Reddy)  has a nightmare of his father's car meeting with a terrible accident and the very next day he has to go alone to a forest to shoot some pictures.  A broker Kavariman (Singampuli) guides Ram to a deserted bungalow whose watchman Yogi Babu lets them in for a bribe and some liquor.  Well past midnight inside the house Ram finds a memory card and in it there are pictures of a girl in a compromising position whom he recognizes and calls one of his friends in Chennai and tries to email them but fails.  Thereafter he undergoes a scary time as a hideous woman appears in the bathroom, the fridge and his bedroom causing him to panic and leave the house. Driving his car all through the way he gets into one scary situation after the other and finally finds out why the ghost is after him but only after a great personal tragedy.

Cast 
 Bharath Reddy as Ram
 Meenakshi Dixit as Annu
 Vishakha Singh as Abhinaya
 Urvashi
 Singampuli as Kavariman
 Yogi Babu
 Jangiri Madhumitha
 King Kong
 Lollu Sabha Manohar 
 Dinesh Sharavana
 John Vijay

Production 
Manisharma began Bayam Oru Payanam during mid-2015 and revealed that the film was "almost complete" by October 2015. Vishakha Singh, Bharath Reddy and Meenakshi Dixit were announced to be playing the lead roles in the film, with the makers describing it as a "female-orientated, horror film". The team shot a twenty-day schedule in Munnar during late December 2015, with Vishakha Singh portraying a ghost in her scenes. Filming for the project ended during January 2016 after a schedule in Chennai, with post-production works beginning thereafter.

References

External links
 

2016 films
Indian horror films
2010s Tamil-language films
Films shot in Munnar
2016 horror films